Diana Beaumont (8 May 1909 – 21 June 1964) was a British actress. In 1932 she starred in the West End run of the hit comedy While Parents Sleep by Anthony Kimmins, while in 1934 she appeared in Ian Hay's Admirals All.

Selected filmography
 Alibi (1929)
 The Old Man (1931)
 When London Sleeps (1932)
 A Lucky Sweep (1932)
 Side Streets (1933)
 Autumn Crocus (1934)
 A Real Bloke (1935)
 The Secret Voice (1936)
 They Didn't Know (1936)
 Birds of a Feather (1936)
 Make It Three (1938)
 Murder in Soho (1939)
 Come On George! (1939)
 Hi Gang! (1941)
 Let the People Sing (1942)
 Stolen Face (1952)
 Home at Seven (1952)
 Aunt Clara (1954)

References

External links

1909 births
1964 deaths
British film actresses
Actresses from London
20th-century British actresses
20th-century English women
20th-century English people